Dixieland is an unincorporated community in Imperial County, California.

A post office operated at Dixieland from 1912 to 1935.

References

Unincorporated communities in Imperial County, California
El Centro metropolitan area
Imperial Valley
Populated places in the Colorado Desert
Unincorporated communities in California